BMLG Records, formerly Republic Nashville, is a record label established in 2009 by Republic Records in New York and Big Machine Records in Nashville. It is headquartered on Music Row and utilizes the combined resources of Big Machine Records and Republic Records. In March 2014, Big Machine announced it will revive defunct record label Dot Records as a sister label for Republic Nashville. Until 2015, the label was owned by the Universal Music Group; however, in July 2015, the Big Machine Label Group acquired full ownership of the label as part of distribution negotiations.

In August 2016, Republic Nashville was rebranded as BMLG Records.

BMLG Records roster
Riley Green
Lady A
Brett Young

Past artists

Danielle Bradbery (moved to Big Machine)
The Band Perry
Greg Bates
Eli Young Band (moved to Valory)
Fast Ryde
Florida Georgia Line
Ryan Follese
Jaron and the Long Road to Love
Jackie Lee
Martina McBride (moved to Nash Icon)
Cassadee Pope
SHEL
Dallas Smith
Sunny Sweeney
A Thousand Horses
Drake White

Past Dot Records artists

Tucker Beathard (moved to Big Machine)
Craig Wayne Boyd
Ashley Campbell
Aaron Lewis (moved to Valory)
Maddie & Tae 
Carly Pearce (moved to Big Machine)
Drake White (moved to BMLG)
Steven Tyler
The Shires
Zac Brown Band

See also
List of record labels

References

American record labels
Labels distributed by Universal Music Group
Companies based in Nashville, Tennessee